Írafár is an Icelandic pop group formed in 1998 in Reykjavík. Its name means "Chaotic state" in Icelandic.

In the summer of 2000 Írafár released their first single, "Hvar er ég?" ("Where Am I?"). They released another two singles the following year. After signing a contract with Skifan, a major Icelandic music label, they released their first album, Allt sem ég sé ("Everything I See") in November 2002. The album was certified platinum in their native country and sold 13,000 units as of 2002.

In 2003, Írafár member Birgitta Haukdal was voted Star of the Year and Pop Artist of the Year. She was then chosen to represent Icelandic public radio and television in the Eurovision Song Contest 2003 in Riga, Latvia. She sang the song "Open your heart", originally titled "Segðu Allt mer" ("Tell Me Everything"), and finished eighth in the competition. Haukdal tried unsuccessfully to represent Iceland in Eurovision again in 2006 with the song "Mynd Af Þér" ("Picture from You").

Members
Birgitta Haukdal - Vocals 
Vignir Snaer Vigfusson - Guitar and Vocals 
Sigurdur Runar Samúelsson - Bass 
Andri Guðmundsson - Keyboard 
Jóhann Ólafsson Bachmann - Drums

Discography

Albums
 Allt sem ég sé ("Everything I See") (2002)
 Nýtt upphaf ("A New Beginning") (2003)
 Írafár (2005)

Singles
 "Hvar er ég?" ("Where Am I?") (2000)
 "Fingur" ("Finger") (2001)
 "Eldur í mér" ("Fire in Me") (2001)
 "Ég sjálf" ("Myself") (2002)
 "Stórir hringir" ("Large Rings") (2002)
 "Allt sem ég sé" ("Everything I See") (2002)
 "Aldrei mun ég" ("Never Will I") (2003)
 "Fáum aldrei nóg" ("We Never Get Enough") (2003)
 "Stel frá þér" ("Steal Away") (2003)
 "Lífið" ("Life") (2004)
 "Leyndarmál" ("Secret") (2005)
 "Alla tíð" ("Always") (2005)
 "Ég missi alla stjórn" ("I Lost All Control") (2005)
 "Þú vilt mig aftur" (2018)

References

External links
 Official website (in Icelandic)

Icelandic pop music groups
Musical groups from Reykjavík